Lamb Creek is a  long first-order tributary to Middle Branch Verdigre Creek in Knox County, Nebraska.

Course
Lamb Creek rises on the North Branch Verdigre Creek divide about 4 miles west of Walnut, Nebraska in Holt County and then flows southeast into Knox County to join Verdigre Creek about 3 miles southwest of Walnut, Nebraska.

Watershed
Lamb Creek drains  of area, receives about 25.6 in/year of precipitation, has a wetness index of 529.41, and is about 0.54% forested.

See also

List of rivers of Nebraska

References

Rivers of Holt County, Nebraska
Rivers of Knox County, Nebraska
Rivers of Nebraska